Cycling Team Capec was a Kazakh UCI Continental cycling team that existed from 2004 until 2006.

Final team roster

Major wins
2004
Overall Tour of Greece, Assan Bazayev
2005
Overall Tour of China, Andrey Mizourov
Overall Vuelta a la Independencia Nacional, Andrey Mizourov
2006
Overall Tour d'Egypte, Ilya Chernyshov

References

Defunct cycling teams based in Kazakhstan
Cycling teams established in 2004
Cycling teams disestablished in 2006
UCI Continental Teams (Europe)
2004 establishments in Kazakhstan
2006 disestablishments in Kazakhstan